Berghaupten is a municipality in the district of Ortenau in Baden-Württemberg in Germany.
Furthermore, it is a state-approved resort located in the Black Forest. Neighbouring municipalities are Ohlsbach (in the north), Gengenbach (in the east), Hohberg (in the south – west) as well as Offenburg (in the north-west). 

On the nearby hill of Geißkopf (359 m) there is evidence of a Roman or Germanic military encampment.

References

Ortenaukreis